Niklas Jarl (born 6 September 1967), known professionally as Nick Jarl, is a Swedish songwriter, record producer and musician. Some of his songs include "You Make Me Feel" - Westlife (co-written by Max Martin), "Heal" - Westlife (co-written by Savan Kotecha), "Written in the Stars" - Westlife (co-written by Andreas Carlsson), "I Promise You That" - Westlife, "Stay with Me" - Ironik, and "I Don't Need a Lover" - Will Young, Waterline - Jedward.

Selected discography

References

1967 births
Living people
Swedish record producers
Swedish songwriters